Ness B. Shroff is an American engineer, educator and researcher known for contributions to wireless networking, network control, and network analysis. He is professor in ECE and CSE departments at Ohio State University, where he holds the Ohio Eminent Scholar Chaired Professorship of Networking and Communications.

Education 
Shroff received his B.S. from the University of Southern California in 1988, his M.S. from the University of Pennsylvania in 1990, his M.Phil from Columbia University, in 1993, and his PhD from Columbia University, NY in 1994.

Career and research 

Shroff and his student Xin Liu and colleague Edwin Chong were among the first researchers to recognize the importance of opportunistic scheduling in wireless networks with short-term fairness  Opportunistic scheduling is the idea that variability in wireless channel quality can be exploited to maximize network throughput while taking into account some measure of quality of service. Using connections to convex optimization theory and stochastic approximations, he developed online opportunistic scheduling mechanisms that could guarantee a variety of explicit fairness guarantees. Opportunistic scheduling is now a part of the communication paradigm in every modern mobile phone.

Shroff with his PhD student Xiaojun Lin were among the first researchers to show that a network utility maximization framework of wireless resource allocation provides a mathematical interpretation of the functionalities of the various layers of the network protocol stack. Specifically, by making a connection to Lagrange multiplier theory in convex optimization, they  showed that queue length information shared across multiple layers provided the right feedback to design resource allocation algorithms for the transport, network and medium access control protocols. These tools and techniques have now become standards in cross-layer network design and his survey paper  on opportunistic scheduling and cross-layer design was also influential in making the topic widely accessible to a large audience.

Shroff and his student Sellke developed a novel technique to protect computer networks for Internet worms and viruses. combat the most dangerous form of computer virus.  The technique automatically detects when an Internet worm has infected a network and signals network administrators to isolate the infected machine and quarantine them for repairs.

Shroff is currently leading a large multi-organization team, composed of universities, private companies, and research labs, which has been selected by the National Science Foundation for developing new Artificial Intelligence techniques to design future wireless networks.

Awards and honors 
 Best Paper Award, IEEE INFOCOM 2006, 2008 and 2016.
 Appears on the List of Most highly cited researchers Thomson Reuters 2014 and 2015.
 IEEE INFOCOM 2014 achievement award
 Appears on the List of The World's Most Influential Scientific Minds in 2014.
 Best student paper award, IEEE WiOPT 2012 and 2013.
 IEEE Fellow (Class of 2007).
 2006 Best Student Paper Award, IEEE International Workshop on Quality of Service (IWQoS).
 2005 Best paper of the year award, Journal of Communications and Networks.
 2003 Best paper of the year award, Computer Networks.
 1996 NSF Career Award

References

External links 

Living people
Ohio State University faculty
Year of birth missing (living people)